The 1948 All-Pro Team consisted of American football players who were chosen by various selectors for the All-Pro team for the 1948 football season. Teams were selected by, among others, the Associated Press (AP), the United Press (UP), The Sporting News, and the New York Daily News. The AP and Sporting News selections included players from the National Football League (NFL) and All-America Football Conference; the UP selections were limited to players from the NFL.

Selections

References

All-Pro Teams
1948 National Football League season